The Texas Longhorns men's track & field program is coached by Edrick Floréal. The Longhorns were runners-up in the outdoor championships in 1987, 1988, and 1997 but have never won a title. Other notable coaches of the Texas men's program have included Bubba Thornton, who also coached the 2008 US Olympic team, Stan Huntsman (1986–95), who also coached the 1988 US Olympic team, and Clyde Littlefield (Texas coach, 1920–60), the 1925 co-founder of the annual Texas Relays. The men won four consecutive Big 12 Indoor Championships between 2006 and 2009. The men have won 41 individual titles, 10th most of all schools.

The Longhorn track and field programs have produced numerous Olympians for various nations. Male medalists include Ryan Crouser (United States, shot put, 2016), Leonel Manzano (United States, silver, 1500 meters, 2012), Winthrop Graham (Jamaica, silver, 400m hurdles, 1992 and 4 × 400 m relay, 1988), Patrick Sang (Kenya, silver, 3000m steeplechase, 1992), Du'aine Ladejo (Great Britain, bronze, 4 × 400 m relay, 1992), Lam Jones (USA, gold, 4 × 100 m relay, 1976), Eddie Southern (USA, silver, 400m hurdles, 1956), and Dean Smith (sprinter) (USA, gold, 4 × 100 m relay, 1952).

Head coaches
Source

Yearly Record
Source

Note: The 2020 season was canceled after the Big 12 Indoor Championships due to the Coronavirus Pandemic, the Big 12 Outdoor and NCAA Championships were not held.

NCAA Individual Event Champions

Source

Conference Individual Event Champions

Source
As of Nov 20, 2022

See also
Texas Longhorns women's track and field
Texas Longhorns men's cross country
Texas Longhorns women's cross country

References

College track and field teams in the United States